Thimo may refer to:

Thiemo, Archbishop of Salzburg
Thimo of Wettin, son of Marquis Dietrich II of Niederlausitz